Lindholmiola spectabilis is a species of air-breathing land snail, a terrestrial pulmonate gastropod mollusc in the family Helicodontidae.

Geographic distribution 
This species is endemic to Greece, where it occurs in the north and north-eastern part of the country's mainland.

See also
List of non-marine molluscs of Greece

References

Further reading

Lindholmiola
Molluscs of Europe
Endemic fauna of Greece
Gastropods described in 1860